Álvaro Manuel Rojas Marín (born 9 May 1953) is a Chilean scholar and researcher who served as minister during the first government of Michelle Bachelet (2006–2010).

References

1953 births
Living people
University of Chile alumni
Technical University of Munich alumni
21st-century Chilean politicians
Christian Democratic Party (Chile) politicians
Ministers of Agriculture of Chile
People from Santiago
Ambassadors of Chile to Germany
Heads of universities in Chile